Gonospira nevilli is an extinct species of air-breathing land snail, terrestrial pulmonate gastropod mollusk in the family Streptaxidae.

This species was endemic to Mauritius. It is now extinct.

References

Gonospira
Extinct gastropods
Gastropods described in 1867
Taxonomy articles created by Polbot
Endemic fauna of Mauritius